Windfields Farm was a six square kilometre (1,500 acre) Thoroughbred horse breeding farm that was founded by businessman E. P. Taylor in Oshawa, Ontario, Canada.

Origin
The first stable and breeding operation of E. P. Taylor originated with a property north of the city of Toronto on Bayview Avenue. Taylor then acquired the Parkwood Stable in Oshawa when it was offered for sale in 1950 by Colonel Sam McLaughlin (of McLaughlin Motor Car Company fame), and he named his new purchase the National Stud Farm. In 1969, the name was changed to Windfields Farm Limited, Oshawa Division. As population growth overtook the operation, it eventually expanded to include a second farm, Windfields Farm (Maryland) in Chesapeake City, Maryland, United States.

Northern Dancer

Windfields Farm in Ontario was the birthplace of racing great and champion sire Northern Dancer, winner of the 1964 Kentucky Derby (in stakes record time), the Preakness Stakes, and the Queen's Plate. Northern Dancer was retired after the 1964 racing season and started a career at stud in Ontario, before being moved in 1969 to the Maryland farm. Northern Dancer's son, the English Triple Crown winner Nijinsky, was also bred by E. P. Taylor at Windfields in Ontario, as was another Northern Dancer colt, the 1977 Epsom Derby winner The Minstrel.

Decline and closure
In 1980, E. P. Taylor was incapacitated by a stroke, and his son Charles took over management of Windfields Farm. E.P. Taylor died in 1989 and Charles died in 1997, after which his widow Noreen and sister Judith Taylor Mappin took charge of the business. The Maryland site was sold in 1988, and Roland Farm and the Northview Stallion Station now occupy the land.

The downsizing that began following the death of E. P. Taylor resulted in large portions of Windfields Farm being sold to the University of Ontario Institute of Technology (UOIT) and Durham College, which erected sports fields and parking lots on the farm's southeast corner. Farmlands on the east side of Simcoe Street became housing developments. By 2008, the once-vast estate (that at its peak was home to more than 600 thoroughbreds) had devolved to just a small private farm.

In November 2009, the Windfields Farm breeding operations were wound up. Its broodmares and weanlings were sent to be auctioned at the Canadian Thoroughbred Horse Society Winter Mixed Sale, and its remaining bloodstock was sold at the Keeneland Sales in Lexington, Kentucky. Shortly afterwards, the contents of the farm, literally to the bare walls, was auctioned and the property was effectively abandoned.

Already engulfed by urban sprawl, Windfields sold much of the non-core portions of the property to real estate developers for the purpose of residential development. Some of the farm's barns, the grave of Northern Dancer, plus a trillium forest where fifteen horses are interred, was reported to be preserved as a commemorative park, but as of the fall of 2012, these plans remained unfulfilled, and the future of the property and its historic structures and graves remained in a state of confusion. It appears that there were no firm plans put in place by the Taylor family, Durham College or UOIT before the final closure of the farm in order to ensure its preservation.

Post closure

2009–2012 
After the farm's closure, the planned preservation failed to materialize. The property, buildings and graves were left instead to fall into a state of decay and disrepair. Pictures began to appear of the grave sites of world-famous Northern Dancer and other notable Windfields horses with tall weeds surrounding them, as well as the historical structures covered in overgrowth. The property and its many buildings had begun falling prey to vandals, the elements, and time.

A small group of supporters who were disappointed in the apparent near-abandonment of the property (and what appeared to be a dismal future for its structures) began to advocate for the property in late 2009, with efforts beginning in earnest in 2010. The media was contacted and several stories were published in both local television and print media during 2010, 2011, and 2012, as well as a feature article in the Toronto Star newspaper entitled "Hero Racehorse Rests Amongst The Weeds", addressing the dismal condition and lack of respect for the farm and the famous horses interred there – most notably Northern Dancer. In addition, presentations were made to the City of Oshawa Council and a letter-writing campaign was also enacted, all of which served to bring the situation to public awareness.

The negative media attention garnered from the fall 2011 Toronto Star article spurred the owners of the "Core" property (Durham College and/or The University Of Ontario Institute of Technology, UOIT) to step up maintenance of the gravesite areas and pledge to better respect the property. They made no other commitments about the property at that time.

2012 
In the fall of 2012, the City of Oshawa became an ally to the cause for proper respect for the Windfields Farm property and its legacy. At the behest of the city, UOIT agreed to form a "Community Advisory Group"  to allow all interested parties to discuss the future of the farm in detail. The situation began to improve as UOIT began to exhibit a willingness to show the Windfields Farm legacy the respect it deserved.   Unfortunately there appeared to be minimal followup from the formation of this group.

2013 
During 2013, grounds maintenance was stepped up, including routine grass cutting and a general cleanup of overgrowth in the vicinity of the core buildings.  Many repairs and changes were effected to the property and its buildings as well during the 2012 to 2014 period, including the following:

 Several buildings received roofing repairs (including an entire re-shingling of Barn 6) intended to halt water damage, which was causing rapid deterioration of several of the historic structures on the property.
 The heating systems in several of the remaining houses in the vicinity of the core were repaired and returned to service.
 Eaves troughs, lightning rods, and other metalwork on various buildings that had been stolen by scrap metal thieves during previous years were replaced.
 Security patrols were increased dramatically.
 Electricity was restored in many areas.
 Lighting was installed.
 Security cameras were installed in strategic locations around the property.
 Various buildings, the arena, and barns, many of which had been left unsecured for many years, were once again secured.
 Pumping systems that had failed, causing subsequent flooding of some areas, were restored to operational condition.

2014 
In the late summer of 2014, the public was once again welcomed to the farm during "Doors Open Oshawa", a citywide event that allows the public to visit venues which are normally closed to public access. This was the first time since the auction in 2009 that the public was able to legally access and visit the core property area of Windfields Farm in order to see the facilities, its heritage structures, and to pay their respects at the graves of Northern Dancer and the other horses interred at the main grave site. The event was well attended.

The core of the farm showed a dramatic turnaround from previous years, with the grounds (and grave site area) appearing well kept and the repair efforts (basic and otherwise) on the many core buildings being evident to those who had followed their plight. Although many of the buildings still showed areas of concern, it appears the preservation efforts and repairs made to date had at least halted further deterioration of the buildings. During the Doors Open event, it was shared that the university has begun exploratory meetings and discussions with regards to fundraising to allow further repairs to the buildings, barns, and the arena.

2015–present 
After the "Doors Open" event in 2014 to current day, the current owners of the core of the farm (The University of Ontario Institute of Technology) have taken a much less public approach to the property, having hosted no publicly accessible events since that date, although several private events have taken place.  Although photos that have appeared online show that the core of the farm remains well tended and additional structure repairs have occurred, as of January 2018 there still appears to be no firm plans to fulfil many of the earlier promises of public access to the grave sites, and the property is clearly posted as "Private Property" with no public access whatsoever.

In 2016, the city of Oshawa followed up on some earlier plans with a "Proposed Program for Honouring the Windfields Farm Legacy"  document detailing some studies funded by an earlier controversial donation of $150,000 by Minto Developments.     The results, under the banner "Program for Honouring the Windfields Farm Legacy" were adopted  on February 22, 2016, but since this date there has been little news with regards to forward progress on many of the goals.

2022-There are at least 4 plaques explaining about EP, Charles Taylor, Windfield Farms and the horse Cemetery.

These are on the west side of the new subdivision in the naturalized area.  The horse cemetery is fenced with a new iron fence, but the grounds are unkept, likely keeping with the naturalization of the area.

University re-purposing of structures
Several structures upon the core of the farm have been repurposed for use by University of Ontario Institute of Technology staff as either office space or storage. There is now increased activity on and around the core of the farm as a result, in addition to a regular security presence.

TV filming 
In January 2018, an episode of the television series Taken utilized "Barn 2" upon the Windfields core property as a filming location, with the barn and its many stalls taking the place of a jail. Exact filming dates were unclear.

Former paddock lands development 
In 2018, development of the majority of what used to be paddocks and open fields to the north of the core of the farm (some ) began on a new residential neighbourhood, with several streets now bordering onto the core of the farm itself. A large retail complex is also planned for the northeast portion of this section of property.

Burials at Windfields Farm
A non-exhaustive list of thoroughbred burials at Windfields Farm in Oshawa include:
 Archers Bay (1995–2002)
 Canadiana (1950–1971)
 New Providence (1956–1981)
 Northern Dancer (1961–1990)
 South Ocean (1967–1989)
 Vice Regent (1967–1995)
 Victoria Park (1957–1985)
 Windfields (1943–1969)

Numerous other lesser-known horses are buried at the separate "Trillium" grave site located slightly to the north of the core of the farm. The trillium grave site was afforded protection by the city and will be maintained as an area of importance to the history of Windfields, although its exact integration with the new housing subdivision is unclear to some.

Lesser yet known horses were also commonly buried at various other places on the once vast Windfields property, almost all in unmarked graves.

Windfields Estate

Windfields Estate was the home of E. P. Taylor and was situated at 2489 Bayview Avenue in North York, Ontario, a suburb of Toronto. It now houses the Canadian Film Centre, founded by filmmaker Norman Jewison. The  estate has been preserved as a heritage site.

References

External links
 Grave Matters: Windfields Farm at the National Sporting Library's Thoroughbred Heritage website
 Windfields Farm official website - Now defunct, no longer serves website . Wayback Machine archive can be located here.
 Windfields Farm at the National Thoroughbred Racing Association (NTRA)
 Major Stakes Winners/Champions bred by Windfields & E.P. Taylor

Canadian racehorse owners and breeders
Owners of King's Plate winners
Owners of Kentucky Derby winners
Breeders of Kentucky Derby winners
Owners of Preakness Stakes winners
Breeders of Preakness Stakes winners
Breeders of Epsom Derby winners
American racehorse owners and breeders
Horse farms in Canada
Estate gardens in Canada
Oshawa
1936 establishments in Ontario
2009 disestablishments in Ontario